Central Village Tower is a  Student accommodation tower in Leeds, West Yorkshire, England.
The tower was built to provide an extra 404 cluster bedrooms to the city’s current strongly growing student market. The tower was also part of phase 2 of the development of Central Village which provides around 1000 Student Bedrooms now it is completed.

Gallery

See also 

 List of tallest buildings in Leeds
 Architecture of Leeds

References

Buildings and structures in Leeds